Vera Grabe Loewenherz is a Colombian anthropologist, politician, and former member of the Colombian guerrilla M-19, of which she was also a co-founder. She successfully rejoined society through a peace accord that permitted rebels to disarm and suffer no retaliation from the Government.

Under the banner of the M-19 Democratic Alliance, a political party spin-off of the former armed group, she was elected to Congress, first as Representative of the Chamber, and then as Senator of Colombia. In the Colombian presidential election of 2002 she ran as vice presidential candidate for Luis Eduardo Garzón in the Social and Political Front ticket.

She has worked as a diplomatic attachée on human rights with the Embassy of Colombia in Spain, Director of the NGO Observatorio para la Paz (1998–1999), professor and editor, and peace advocate.

References

1951 births
Living people
People from Bogotá
19th of April Movement members
Colombian women anthropologists
Colombian anthropologists
Colombian political scientists
Colombian women in politics
Colombian people of German descent
Members of the Chamber of Representatives of Colombia
Members of the Senate of Colombia
Colombian torture victims
Women in war in Colombia
Women in warfare post-1945
Women political scientists